Xait (pronounced "excite") is a software development company, specializing in Web-based database services. The company provides its customers with software for document publishing and collaboration. Its product, XaitPorter, is a collaborative-writing software and is used by clients worldwide to create bids, proposals, financial reports, contracts and other business critical documentation. In Norway, the majority of all Oil operators use XaitPorter for writing their drilling license applications. At the 22nd licensing round in Norway, 100% of the oil & gas operator licenses on Norwegian continental shelf were awarded to XaitPorter clients. The company has been ISO/IEC 27001 certified since 2016, and has since received re-certification the following years.

Xait is headquartered in Sandnes, Rogaland, Norway with a sales and support office in Austin, Texas, United States.

Managed Collaborative Authoring Process
The Managed Collaborative Authoring Process is a document creation technique and term invented by Xait in 2001 by which a structured and controlled collection of tasks and events create repetitive business value through quality, efficiency and security improvements, when applied to a group of writers, reviewers and/or approvers.

The reuse of documentation and a means to improve the processes surrounding this has been an issue since the late-1980s  early-1990s, when wordprocessing was embraced by the masses as the main tool for document production. David M. Levy wrote a paper on this back in 1993, highlighting some of the issues regarding document reuse. "The world, though continually changing, is changing incrementally. Much remains the same (unchanged) at any one time, at least at the granularity of description we typically care about. This means that documents only need to be updated incrementally; and incremental updating is more easily achieved when existing material is reused."

Allowing the company to structure and control the rate and quality of the re-use of content, as well as keeping in line with compliance and security, gives an approach for Best practice when reusing content.

XaitPorter is currently one of the commonly used document collaboration software packages that is in line with the managed collaborative authoring process.

History

Early years 

The company was founded in 2000 in Stavanger. Xait first started developing a content management system called XaitExposure and a customer relationship management product called XaitExonerate. In 2002 however, the company announced collaborative writing software called Publish-As-You-Go, later renamed XaitPorter.

Recent years 
In 2016, Xait received investment from the Nordic venture fund Viking Venture, resulting in an ownership stake of 43%. On December 16, 2019, Xait was awarded 10.8 million NOK by the Norwegian Research Council to improve quality and efficiency in the RFP to production lifecycle. In 2020, Xait acquired BlueprintCPQ, a provider of enterprise-class configure, price and quote software worldwide. With the acquisition, Xait added Configure, price and quote (CPQ) software to its solution offering. In 2021, Xait did their second acquisition with Privia, a worldwide provider of capture and proposal management-specific solutions to the government contractor market.

Awards
Xait was awarded "Best Web Collaboration Solution" at the 2014 UP-Start Cloud Awards in San Francisco.
Xait was named a Gartner Sample Vendor in the 2014 Content Management Hype Cycle, within Collaborative Authoring tools.
Xait was named a Gartner Cool Vendor in 2013.
XaitPorter was awarded ”Star of Show” at the 2004 PETEX Conference and Exhibition.

Technology
The database is built on Oracle Corporation architecture.
In May 2013, Xait and Mike Parkinsons's GetMyGraphic formed a strategic partnership. Allowing users of Xait to integrate GetMyGraphic's database of editable graphics right into their XaitPorter documents.
XaitPorter is offered as a turn-key solution in the form of a cloud-based Software-as-a-Service (SaaS) or as an appliance (Solution-In-A-Box), as well as traditional proprietary software for installation on customer-provided hardware.
XaitPorter introduced integration with Salesforce.com, allowing automation of proposals and contracts.
XaitPorter implements a Managed Collaborative Authoring Process.

Customers
The company's customers include:
 Oil & Gas/Energy companies
 Maritime Ship Design Companies
 Private healthcare providers
 Facilities Management Companies
 Life Sciences
 Technology companies
 Engineering
 Defense
 Legal
 Finance
 Construction
 Standards Organisations

See also
 Project management
 Document management system
 Revision control
 collaborative editing
 mass collaboration

References

Companies established in 2000
Software companies of Norway
Business software companies
Norwegian brands